is a side-scrolling action role-playing video game developed and published by Sega for the Master System. It was released in 1988.

Kenseiden stars Hayato, a samurai that has to fight against warlocks and evil spirits that plague 16th century Japan. The warlocks stole the five secret scrolls and the sword of the Dragon Lord. Hayato, who has dragon blood in his veins, must recover the scrolls and sword, enter the castle and kill Oda Nobunaga.

The game was released as Hwarang-ui Geom (화랑의 검, "Sword of the Flower Knight") in South Korea and has the main character sprite altered to look like a Korean warrior and the Japanese map changed to a map of Korea. In the original Japanese version, Hayato is blond. In the Western versions he has black hair.

Gameplay

Each round represents one of the old Japanese provinces. In the Korean version of the game the rounds represent locations of Korea. After round 2, the player can choose any one of the nearest levels in the map. The player can go back to any level at any time after finishing it, except the final level.

Reception

Upon release, The Games Machine gave the game an 86% score, considering it one of the best "hack-'n-slay" games due to its "simple but highly playable action and superb presentation." Computer and Video Games gave it an 85% score, describing it as a "huge" role-playing adventure with exploration, "truly superb" still screens and "plenty of brain-bending puzzles" to last "weeks on end!"

Retrospectively, Levi Buchanan of IGN reviewed Kenseiden. He gave the game a 7.0 and said "even though I found the choice to go grim interesting and the visuals engaging, I have discovered my appreciation for Kenseiden was more of a 'love the one your [sic] with' sentiment. Master System junkies should still seek it out and give it a go, but there are indeed better games for the console that deserve your renewed attention."

References

External links

1988 video games
Fantasy video games
Platform games
Sega video games
Master System games
Master System-only games
Video games about samurai
Video games set in feudal Japan
Action role-playing video games
Single-player video games
Video games developed in Japan